Plants vs. Zombies is a 2009 tower defense video game developed and published by PopCap Games. First released for Windows and Mac OS X, the game has since been ported to consoles, handhelds, and mobile devices. The player takes the role of a homeowner amid a zombie apocalypse. As a horde of zombies approaches along several parallel lanes, the player must defend the home by putting down plants, which fire projectiles at the zombies or otherwise detrimentally affect them. The player collects a currency called sun to buy plants. If a zombie happens to make it to the house on any lane, the player loses and must restart the level.

Plants vs. Zombies was designed by George Fan, who conceptualized it as a more defense-oriented sequel to his fish simulator game Insaniquarium (2001), then developed it into a tower defense game featuring plants fighting against zombies. The game took inspiration from the games Magic: The Gathering and Warcraft III; along with the movie Swiss Family Robinson. It took three and a half years to make Plants vs. Zombies. Rich Werner was the main artist, Tod Semple programmed the game, and Laura Shigihara composed the game's music. In order to appeal to both casual and hardcore gamers, the tutorial was designed to be simple and spread throughout Plants vs. Zombies.

Plants vs. Zombies was positively received by critics and was nominated for multiple awards, including "Download Game of the Year" and "Strategy Game of the Year" as part of Golden Joystick Awards 2010. Reviewers praised the game's humorous art style, simplistic but engaging gameplay, and soundtrack. Upon release in May 2009, it was the fastest-selling video game developed by PopCap Games and quickly became their best-selling game, surpassing Bejeweled and Peggle. By 2010, it had sold over a million copies worldwide and has since been considered one of the greatest video games of all time. In 2011, PopCap was bought by Electronic Arts (EA). The company laid off Fan and 49 other employees, marking a change of focus to mobile and social gaming. After the buyout, Plants vs. Zombies was followed by a series of games including two direct sequels, three third-person shooters, and two spin-offs, most of which have received positive reviews.

Gameplay

Plants vs. Zombies is a tower defense video game in which the player defends a house from zombies. The lawn is divided into a grid, with the player's house to the left. The player places different types of plants on individual squares of the grid. Each plant has a different style of defense, such as shooting, exploding, and blocking. Different types of zombies have their own special behaviors and their own weaknesses to different plants. For example, Balloon Zombie can float over the player's plants, but its balloon can be popped by Cactus. Other examples of zombies include Dancing Zombie which summons Backup Dancers around himself; and the Dolphin Rider Zombie, which rides on a dolphin to jump over a plant.

The player can pick a limited number of types of plants through seed packets at the beginning of each level, and must pay to place them using a currency called "sun". The player collects sun by either clicking on sun icons that randomly appear over the lawn, or by using certain plants that generate sun, like Sunflowers and Sun-shrooms. Each type of plant recharges between each placement at various speeds. A shovel can be used to dig up and remove plants. Positioned at the left end of each lane is a single-use lawnmower; if a zombie reaches this end, the mower activates and kills all zombies in that lane. If a zombie reaches the end of a lane whose mower has already been used, the player has to restart the level.

Adventure mode
There are five stages in the Adventure mode, each comprising ten levels. At the end of nearly every level, the player collects a new type of plant to use in subsequent levels. On the first level of stage two (level 21), zombies begin to occasionally drop in-game money when killed. After level 34, the player can spend the money at an in-game store called Crazy Dave's Twiddydinkies. Crazy Dave offers boosts that the player uses to upgrade already-placed plants and gardening tools for the player's Zen Garden. It is unlocked after level 54 and allows the player to water and maintain a group of plants, which are obtained as loot from killing zombies or purchasing them through his store; in return, the plants generate money for the player. Every stage's fifth level has a mini-game challenge, often utilizing a conveyor belt that gives various plants to the player. On every stage's tenth level, the player receives plants from a conveyor belt. Stages one, three, and five occur in daylight, while stages two and four take place at night.

During the nighttime stages, the player uses the lower-cost fungi plants due to the lack of natural sun generation at night. Stages three and four take place in the house's backyard, which has six lanes (unlike the usual five lanes) and features a pool taking up the middle two lanes. On the pool, plants are placed on top of Lily Pads which, unlike most plants, can be placed directly on pool lanes. Stage four has fog that obscures most of the lawn. Stage five takes place on the house's roof. This setting has the player use catapult plants, instead of the standard shooting plants, to account for the roof's upward slope.

Adventure mode's last level pits the player against Dr. Zomboss, an evil scientist and the zombies' animator. He crushes the player's plants by having his Zombot crush the plants or throw vans at them, and can place fire and ice balls that roll across a lane. The player subdue these balls with Jalapeños and Ice-shrooms. After completing the Adventure mode, the player can play it again, this time with plants unlocked during the previous play-through, and with three randomly selected plants to begin each level.

Other game modes
Three additional modes—Mini-Games, Puzzle, and Survival—become available once Adventure mode is completed. In Mini-Games mode, the player selects from a collection of twenty mini-games. These levels pose the player with unique challenges, each using some gimmick—often variants of a conveyor belt that gives the player certain plants. In Puzzle mode, the player selects from two types of levels: "Vasebreaker" and "I, Zombie". In "Vasebreaker", the player breaks open a set of vases, each containing a plant or a zombie. The level ends when all the vases are smashed and all the zombies are killed. In "I, Zombie", the player places zombies to get past pre-placed cardboard cut-outs of plants, aiming to eat the brain at the end of each lane. Survival mode offers a selection of levels in which the player chooses plants to defeat increasingly challenging waves of zombies.

Development

Concept

Plants vs. Zombies was designed by George Fan. Imagining a more defense-oriented version of one of his previous titles, Insaniquarium (2001), and having played some Warcraft III tower defense mods, he was inspired to make a tower defense game. Fan considered a sequel to Insaniquarium for the Nintendo DS, each screen would represent a separate fish tank—one on top of the other. Aliens would attack the top fish tank and, if successful, would break into the bottom fish tank. Gameplay in the top tank would focus on defense against the aliens, while in the bottom tank it would revolve around resource generation, akin to Insaniquarium. But inspired by Warcraft III towers, he felt that plants would make good defensive structures. He wanted to bring new concepts to the genre and believed the fact that enemies in tower defense games would never attack the towers was unintuitive. To address this, he began designing the five- and six-lane setups that would later be used in the final game. Enemies were at first the aliens from Insaniquarium, but while Fan was sketching concept art, he drew what he considered "the perfect zombie", and the theming was reworked. Fan went with using zombies instead of aliens in order to make the game stand out from other video games using plants.

Insaniquarium substantially influenced the development of Plants vs. Zombies. The games have similar pacing, determined by the "drip-feeding" of pets and plants respectively, and choosing plants at the beginning of each Plants vs. Zombies level is analogous to choosing pets in Insaniquarium. Fan also took inspiration from the film Swiss Family Robinson, in which a family defends themselves and their home against pirates. Fan included elements from the trading card game Magic: The Gathering, which he had played with his girlfriend, Laura Shigihara. Showing her how to customize their card decks inspired him to design Plants vs. Zombies with seed packets—instead of his original idea of a conveyor belt that gave random plants—due to the seed packet system's greater complexity. While the conveyor belt was dropped from the more common game mode, it remained a special element in select levels. The use of multitasking between lanes was influenced by and was featured prominently in the old arcade game Tapper.

When the game featured aliens, its working title was Weedlings, but Fan thought the name a poor fit because of how many gardening-themed video games were being released at the time. It was renamed Plants vs. Zombies as a placeholder after the enemies were changed. The planned name for most of development was Lawn of the Dead, a pun on the title of the George A. Romero zombie film Dawn of the Dead. Romero did not permit usage of the name, even after a plea from Fan, who sent Romero a video of himself dressed as a Zombie Temp Worker grunting and programming on a computer, subtitled with references to runtime errors. There were many other candidate names, including Residential Evil and Bloom & Doom, the latter of which was used as the branding on the in-game seed packets.

Design
Plants vs. Zombies was initially designed by Fan alone. Because Fan was a full-time employee at PopCap Games, the video game company helped build up a small team consisting of a composer (Laura Shigihara), a programmer (Tod Semple), and an artist (Rich Werner). Fan was based in San Francisco, while Werner was in Seattle. Stephen Notley is credited as being a writer for Plants vs. Zombies. He wrote the plant and zombie descriptions in the in-game guide, the Suburban Almanac. Fan found working in small teams to be easier than working in large teams. According to an interview with Edge, while searching for an artist, Fan discovered Rich Werner, whose work Fan thought matched with his design intentions. Fan attributed the design's intrigue to its animation scheme; Tod Semple suggested using Adobe Flash, which Fan worried would generate an animation "cut out from paper" and too closely resembling South Park, but he was ultimately satisfied, crediting Semple and Werner's talent. Plants vs. Zombies was made using PopCap Games's own engine: PopCap Framework. Fan consistently posted updates of Plants vs. Zombies every four months in an internal forum within PopCap Games called Burrito, where he accepted feedback from the employees of PopCap.

When the concept of Plants vs. Zombies was first established as a sequel to Insaniquarium, Fan wanted to make a game where the aliens invade the player's garden. Originally, his intent was to make a gardening game where plants are grown as an investment to afford defenses against an alien invasion. After Fan created the "perfect zombie", the enemies were changed from aliens to zombies. He trimmed the concept of simultaneously defending and maintaining the garden, feeling that the repetitive gardening detracted from the main gameplay. Simplifying the gardening system, Fan restructured the game's main aspects to fit better into the tower defense genre, and later added further elements inspired by other games. Fan enjoyed the idea of plants defending against the zombies, combining two distinct species that were not yet touched by other game developers at the time. Plants playing as the role of towers made sense to him, acting as stationary defense against the recurring waves of zombies. Zombies were designed to move in the current linear five- and six-lane system in the final game, allowing the enemy zombies to interact with the defensive plants, a refinement in the game that Fan felt worked as a unique gameplay mechanic to make Plants vs. Zombies stand out in the tower defense genre amongst other tower defense games popular at the time.

Plants vs. Zombies took three and a half years to make. Much of the first year of development focused on Adventure mode. Semple began working on ideas later used for Mini-Games mode. Some ideas for the Puzzle mode section were later modified and moved into Adventure mode: "Vasebreaker" and "I, Zombie", for example, came from single-level concepts for Mini-Games mode. During testing, Fan found that the Mini-Games and Puzzle modes detracted from a focus on Adventure mode, so he locked most additional modes, requiring advancement within Adventure mode to unlock them. Later, the development of Plants vs. Zombies consisted of Fan testing the game and writing down notes of what could be done to tweak it before sending them off to Semple. The last year of development had the team fine-tuning Plants vs. Zombies before release.

One of the critical aspects of the development was designing Plants vs. Zombies to be balanced between hardcore and casual gaming. Fan designed the tutorial to be simple and merged within the game to attract casual gamers. It had the player learning by performing actions, rather than reading about how to do the actions. The in-game messages were also made to be as short and easy-to-read as possible; with the dialogue from Crazy Dave being broken up into small chunks of text to match this. The in-game messages were also designed to match a player's skill set; an example being the message telling the player to place Peashooters further to the left would only pop up in an early level if a Peashooter was placed towards the right of the lawn and was eaten. The team discovered that newcomers to the genre of real-time strategy often had difficulty learning the importance of sun collection. The price of the income-generating Sunflowers was halved, encouraging the player to buy them instead of the attack-only Peashooter. The change forced restructuring of the balance between plants and zombies, a move that Fan said was worth the effort.

Characters
Early in the development of Plants vs. Zombies, time was spent brainstorming ideas for characters. Fan purposely gave all the plants and zombies names that matched their individual functions, designing them accordingly—for example, a Peashooter shoots pea projectiles. Fan also made all the plants stationary and all the zombies slowly move across their lane so the casual player would understand that the towers (the rooted plants) could not move and the attackers (the mindless zombies) could slowly move. The final designs of the zombies and plants changed little from their inception. The game's sole human character, Crazy Dave, was a parody of a person Fan knew. Crazy Dave features a vocal performance by Fan.

The final game has 49 types of plants. Fan expressed fondness for the Tall-Nut, Torchwood, and Cob Cannon plants. He liked the Tall-Nut's character, citing its "determined gaze" and its shedding a single tear when hurt. In terms of strategy, he liked that the Torchwood—which gives Peashooters flaming ammunition—required the player to consider how plants interact with each other. Fan also liked the Squash, due to its name's wordplay; the plant crushes zombies. A proposed plant would have been placed above other plants to protect them from Bungee and Catapult Zombies; it was difficult, however, to visualize this plant's position. A similar defensive item (the Umbrella Leaf) made it into the final game, protecting plants from Bungee and Catapult Zombies, but placed next to plants. Many potential plants had concept art but were not in the final Plants vs. Zombies.

Plants vs. Zombies has 26 types of zombies. Fan's favorite zombie was Dr. Zomboss; the team spent a full month designing the fight against him at the end of the game. Fan liked the Pole Vaulting Zombie due to the likely amusement of its first encounter with the player; he gave an example of a player failing to block it with a Wall-Nut plant, with the zombie jumping over the obstruction. The Newspaper Zombie's first iteration simply read a newspaper, but Werner redrew the character as having become a zombie while reading on the toilet. Fan's brother asked him whether he based the zombie on their father, as he would often read the newspaper on the toilet. Fan said that while he had no such intention, it was his favorite backstory to a zombie. The Dancing Zombie initially resembled Michael Jackson from the music video "Thriller". The zombie was present in the game before his death, but the entertainer's estate objected to its inclusion over a year following his death; PopCap replaced it with a more generic disco-dancing zombie. Many other zombies were cut during development.

Soundtrack
Shigihara composed Plants vs. Zombies soundtrack, borrowing elements from pop music and console chiptune. Before the game's inception, Fan asked Shigihara to compose the music for his next title because he admired her music. She drew influence from Danny Elfman's soundtracks and a wide range of musical styles: One song uses marching band percussion and swing; another utilizes techno beats with "organic" sounds. Film music scholar K. J. Donnelly found the music to be bright and "cartoonish". He noted the music was not dynamically tied to gameplay, but instead progresses independently. He noted the soundtrack's design in a progressive style, "almost in parallel to the unfolding of the game[play]".

Shigihara described the music as "macabre, yet goofy". Examining the night stages, she explained that she used a combination of big band swing beats with "several haunting and serious melodies". The songs "Loonboon" and "Brainiac Maniac" were written towards the end of production. Shigihara said these were reactionary songs she wrote to fit the game's feel after playing it through twice. Shigihara composed and performed the music video shown during the game's credits, titled "Zombies on Your Lawn". The song was inspired by "Still Alive", which played at the end of the video game, Portal. Plants vs. Zombies tracks were eventually released as part of a downloadable soundtrack album.

Promotion and release
On April 1, 2009, PopCap released a music video for "Zombies on Your Lawn" to promote Plants vs. Zombies. While many PC gamers were unsure if the video was an elaborate April Fools' Day joke, PopCap spokesperson Garth Chouteau revealed in an IGN interview that the game would soon be released for PC and Mac. On April 22, 2009, PopCap released an official game trailer of Plants vs. Zombies on YouTube. PopCap Games released a demo version on May 4, 2009, permitting thirty minutes of gameplay. Plants vs. Zombies was officially released for PC and Mac on May 5, 2009, A free Adobe Flash version of Plants vs. Zombies was released on September 23, 2009, along with the demo being replaced by a version where the player can play up to level 34.

A Game of the Year edition was released on July 11, 2010. It was made available on Steam on August 11, 2010; anyone who already purchased the game could update to the new edition for free. The Game of the Year edition adds in a "Zombatar" feature allowing the player to customize a zombie's face. The edition also supports Steam Cloud, which lets the player access game save data from multiple computers.

Mobile phone versions
During the announcements for Plants vs. Zombies, PopCap Games revealed the game would be ported to other platforms after the PC release. In August 2009, it was announced on IGN that Plants vs. Zombies would be ported to the iPhone near the end of 2009. They announced the port's release date on a trailer on YouTube in February 2010, officially releasing it on February 15, 2010. The port included a modified interface for iPhone users and a Quick Play mode allowing the player to play any level in Adventure mode; it removed the Mini-Games, Puzzle, and Survival modes.

In March 2010, a technology blog named PadGadget found unintentionally public entries for ports of iPhone games to the iPad, Plants vs. Zombies among them. The game's iPad port, named Plants vs. Zombies HD, was released on April 5, 2010. It utilized the iPad's 11 touch sensors and restored the Survival mode and the Mini-Games mode, which includes an iPad-exclusive mini-game called "Buttered Popcorn". Subsequent iOS updates would add more content to their version of Plants vs. Zombies, including Zen Garden, additional mini-games, and additional achievements.

In May 2011, PopCap Games officially announced that Chuzzle would be available on the Amazon Appstore for Android devices for the next two weeks, with Plants vs. Zombies becoming available later in the month. They were both free on launch day and cost $2.99 after. On May 31, 2011, Plants vs. Zombies entered the Amazon Appstore. In December 2011, PopCap Games announced it would be releasing Plants vs. Zombies and Peggle through the Android Market. It was made available on Google Play Store on December 15, 2011.

Plants vs. Zombies has been ported to other mobile devices. On June 23, 2011, the game was released on the Windows Phone as part of Xbox Live. On November 14, 2011, and January 30, 2013, Plants vs. Zombies was released on the Kindle Fire and Blackberry 10 respectively as a launch app. Plants vs. Zombies was later released on another BlackBerry device, the BlackBerry Playbook. Plants vs. Zombies was released on Nook HD and Nook HD+ on November 14, 2012.

Console versions
Plants vs. Zombies was announced for the Xbox 360 in July 2010, to be available both on its own and as part of a bundle with Peggle and Zuma. The game was released on the Xbox 360 at Xbox Live on September 8, 2010. To ease use with the Xbox controller, the cursor was locked onto the lawn's grid pattern and sun would float towards the cursor. The port also featured Versus mode, a Co-op mode, and a new level in Mini-Games mode. Versus mode matched two players, one playing plants and one playing zombies. The zombie player's goal is reaching the house, while the plant player aims to kill three of the five target zombies on the right side of the lawn. A PlayStation Network port for the PlayStation 3 of Plants vs. Zombies was announced on January 28, 2011, with Sony Online Entertainment as its publisher and was released on February 8, 2011.

The DS port of Plants vs. Zombies was announced in August 2010. The port was released on January 18, 2011, in North America and on May 6, 2011, in Europe and Australia. The port included the Zombatar feature and the versus mode from the Xbox Live version, also adding four exclusive mini-games. On March 14, 2011, the DSiWare port was released in North America. It was released on May 6, 2011, in Europe and Australia. The DSiWare version only kept the Adventure mode and Mini-Games mode; the mini-game levels consisted of the exclusive levels from the original DS and a new level called "Zombie Trap".

The PlayStation Vita port was announced in December 2011. It was released on February 21, 2012, in North America, and in Europe as a launch title on February 22, 2012; With Sony Online Entertainment serving as its publisher. The port allows the player to play using either the touch screen or the controllers. It also introduces the ability to shake the Vita to collect suns and money. Unlike other console versions, the game lacks a multiplayer setting.

Reception

Sales
On May 20, 2009, Plants vs. Zombies was declared the fastest-selling video game created by PopCap Games, quickly becoming their best-selling video game; surpassing their previous popular games: Bejeweled and Peggle. In a presentation at Game Developers Conference China 2010, James Gwertzman, the vice president of the Asia/Pacific division of PopCap Games, revealed the game had sold 1.5 million copies internationally. Fan estimated half of sales came from hardcore gamers. Larry Hryb, director of programming for Xbox Live, reported that Plants vs. Zombies was the thirteenth most purchased 2011 game on Xbox Live Arcade. Plants vs. Zombies was particularly successful on the App Store. According to PopCap, the iOS release of Plants vs. Zombies sold more than 300,000 copies during its first nine days, generating more than $1million in gross sales. It rose to number one in sales and money grossed from a mobile video game before losing the spot nine days after release. , nine million copies have been downloaded across all iOS platforms.

Critical reviews
Plants vs. Zombies received positive reviews. According to Metacritic, the only version that did not receive "generally positive reviews" or "universal acclaim" is the DSiWare version, which received "mixed or average reviews". It has since been considered one of the greatest video games of all time. Some reviewers found the core mechanic straightforward, but the game itself challenging. GamesRadar+ Tom Francis said that Plants vs. Zombies was only casual in its easiness to understand its premise; he clarified, "There's nothing casual about the 30 goddamn hours we've spent, effectively, gardening." Seth Schisel from The New York Times said kids and adults alike would enjoy Plants vs. Zombies. Others disagreed: GameSpot editor Chris Watters said, "Tower defense veterans will have to endure a lot of simple, familiar action in order to find a real challenge, and the wait may prove too long for some"; GamePro Tae Kim said that Plants vs. Zombies was not particularly easy or hard, and that he never had to restart despite being "terrible at these sorts of games." John Walker of Rock Paper Shotgun said the difficulty sometimes felt artificial.

Despite his criticism of the game's difficulty, Watters praised Plants vs. Zombies constant introduction of new plants, which kept the game fresh. Eurogamer editor Christian Donlan agreed: every zombie challenges the player and each new plant allows for a new strategy. Many critics commended Plants vs. Zombies for its minimalistic tutorial allowing experimentation; some had believed the entire Adventure mode was a long tutorial, or a warmup, for other game modes. Many critics praised the game for the replay value offered by additional game modes; Francis said that by the time the player finishes Adventure mode; "the obscene wealth of other things to do already outweighs it for entertainment value."

The art style and music of Plants vs. Zombies have also been praised. Susan Arendt from The Escapist said "the music is excellent, [and] the art is charming and adorable." Many reviewers have called the graphics from Plants vs. Zombies "adorable". Watters praised the unit animation, elaborating that they had a "great sense of personality". Some drew attention to the game's humor. Wired Earnest Cavalli said that while the idea behind Plants vs. Zombies sounds macabre, "every level of the game offers something to laugh about". Marc Saltzman from Gamezebo found humor in the game's many killing methods. IGN editor Daemon Hatfield praised the game's music; he called it a "catchy, organic soundtrack that becomes more intense as your yard is flooded with enemies". In contrast, Walker found the soundtrack "disappointing" and stated, "After the promise of the gorgeous music video, the hope of similarly catchy in-game tunes is not kept."

Critics commended the iPhone port of Plants vs. Zombies for being faithful to the PC version and for its Quick Play mode, but many were disappointed by its omission of the other game modes. Many reviewers praised the iPad port's inclusion of the Mini-Games mode and the Survival mode, along with "Buttered Popcorn", the exclusive mini-game. The Xbox 360 port of Plants vs. Zombies was praised for its addition of exclusive game modes, including a Co-op mode and a Versus mode. The Nintendo DS port was commended for its four new mini-games and its versus mode from the Xbox 360 version, but was considered inferior in its animation and graphics. The port was also criticized for its comparatively high price, for the DS top screen's sole usage as an indicator of level progression, and for unstable frame rate. Many critics found the PS Vita version faithful to the PC version, though unsure about whether or not there enough significant additions in this version to recommend to someone who already has Plants vs. Zombies on another platform.

Awards
Plants vs. Zombies was nominated for various categories in the GameSpot Best of 2009, 2009 Spike Video Game Awards, the 13th Annual Interactive Achievement Awards, the 10th Annual Game Developers Choice Awards, and the 6th and 7th British Academy Games Awards. It won the categories of "Download Game of the Year" and "Strategy Game of the Year" in the Golden Joysticks Awards 2010, and the category of "Best Casual Game" in the 7th International Mobile Gaming Awards. Electronic Arts (EA) claims that Plants vs. Zombies has won over 30 Game of the Year awards.

Legacy

George Fan's layoff and Octogeddon

PopCap Games and its assets were bought by EA on July 12, 2011, for $750million. Fifty employees were laid off from PopCap Games' Seattle studio on August 21, 2012, marking a switch of focus to mobile and social gaming. After a statement by Edmund McMillen, creator of The Binding of Isaac, rumors circulated that Fan was fired by EA because he opposed implementing pay-to-win mechanics in Plants vs. Zombies 2. Fan confirmed in a 2017 tweet that he had been laid off, and that he opposed the freemium aspects of Plants vs. Zombies 2, but did not link the two events.

Three former PopCap employees debunked the notion that Fan was fired because of his concerns over the game, including Allen Murray, a former producer of Plants vs. Zombies 2. They said Fan was fired as part of the systematic lay-offs in August 2012, and he was not even part of the Plants vs. Zombies 2 team; he was working on other ideas for games at the time, including a game called Full Contact Bingo. He had lost interest in Plants vs. Zombies when EA began envisioning the game as a huge franchise. Fan worked on the arcade action-strategy game Octogeddon after being laid off, initially as part of a Ludum Dare contest. The game idea was received positively and Fan formed a company along with Werner, the artist of Plants vs. Zombies, and Kurt Pfeiffer, the programmer of the Xbox 360 port. They developed Octogeddon for several years, releasing it on February 8, 2018, to generally positive reviews, according to Metacritic.

Sequels and spin-offs

Since EA's acquisition of PopCap Games, Plants vs. Zombies has expanded into a franchise spanning many consoles and several genres. Plants vs. Zombies Adventures, a spin-off and social game, was released for Facebook on May 20, 2011, and closed on October 12, 2014. A mainline sequel named Plants vs. Zombies 2 was released for iOS on August 14, 2013. Plants vs. Zombies: Garden Warfare, a multiplayer third-person shooter, was released on February 25, 2014, for the Xbox 360, PlayStation 3, and Xbox One, and its sequel was released on February 23, 2016, for the PlayStation 4 and Xbox One. A digital collectible card game, Plants vs. Zombies Heroes, was released internationally for the iOS on October 18, 2016. The franchise released its third third-person shooter, Plants vs. Zombies: Battle for Neighborville, on October 18, 2019, for the PlayStation 4 and Xbox One. A third mainline title is currently in development for Android and iOS as of October 2020.

According to Metacritic, nearly all the sequels and spin-offs of Plants vs. Zombies received generally positive reviews. Despite his opposition to Plants vs. Zombies 2 freemium model, Fan has praised the series for delving into different genres, particularly Plants vs. Zombies Heroes entering digital card-collecting; he hopes EA will continue the series into more genres while keeping the charm of the original.

Other media
Zen Studios and PopCap made a downloadable content (DLC) interactive pinball table, based on Plants vs. Zombies and using PopCap assets, during development of Zen Pinball 2 and Pinball FX 2. The DLC was released on September 4, 2012, in North America and September 5 in Europe.

In July and August 2013, Dark Horse Comics released six issues of a comic book adaptation miniseries onto an iOS app. The miniseries was called Lawnmageddon, written by Paul Tobin and drawn by Ron Chan. Dark Horse Comics continued releasing issues for the next two years. In 2015 Dark Horse Comics started a monthly release of the comic series, in both digital and print; every three issues formed a separate miniseries. The first print miniseries was called Bully for You.

Cultural references
According to Chris Carter, editor-in-chief of Destructoid, Plants vs. Zombies is frequently referenced in pop culture. Fan said his favorite homage to the game is the Magic: The Gathering card "Grave Bramble", created as part of the Innistrad expansion. A re-creation of Plants vs. Zombies was added as a mini-game quest known as "Peacebloom vs. Ghouls" to World of Warcraft as part of the World of Warcraft: Cataclysm expansion. Shigihara provided some music for the quest.

The song "Bad Guy" (2019) by Billie Eilish was inspired by the theme music for Plants vs. Zombies.

Notes

References

External links

 
 Official artwork and concept art by Rich Werner

Plants vs. Zombies
2009 video games
Android (operating system) games
BlackBerry 10 games
BlackBerry PlayBook games
Casual games
DSiWare games
Electronic Arts games
Flash games
IOS games
MacOS games
Multiplayer and single-player video games
Nintendo DS games
PlayStation 3 games
PlayStation Network games
PlayStation Vita games
PopCap games
Tower defense video games
Windows games
Windows Phone games
Xbox 360 games
Xbox 360 Live Arcade games
Video games about plants
Video games about zombies
Video games adapted into comics
Video games scored by Laura Shigihara
Video games developed in the United States